Curtis Bay is a residential / commercial / industrial neighborhood in the southern portion of the City of Baltimore, Maryland, United States.

The neighborhood is on steep sloping heights, about four city blocks wide (west to east) and fifteen blocks long (north to south) and above and surrounded on three sides (northeast - east - southeast) in a highly industrialized waterfront area  in the southern part of the city, and receives its name from the body (cove) of water to the east in which it sits.  The cove of "Curtis Bay"  with two small branches - Stone House Cove and Cabin Branch is fed from the southwest by Curtis Creek which in turn is formed further south by Marley Creek and Furnace Branch/Creek in Anne Arundel County. Adjoining nearby to the east is Thoms Cove near Hawkins Point at the north end of the Marley Neck peninsula. Curtis Bay cove itself also has a dredged deep water channel with considerable port facilities and waterfront industries and is a branch of the main stem of the Patapsco River, which forms the extensive frontage of Baltimore Harbor and Port, northwest off of the Chesapeake Bay.

The residential community of Curtis Bay is along three major north–south  thoroughfares of Curtis Avenue, Pennington Avenue (Maryland Route 173 on which most commercial businesses are located) and residential Fairhaven Avenue and a partial street of Prudence Street. Running west to east are fifteen smaller residential streets named alphabetically for various types of trees. 
"The Bay", as it is often called colloquially,  also offers a variety of housing, townhouses, rowhouses, individual homes, (both constructed of wood-frame, brick, stone and concrete block/stuccoed) and corner stores, taverns/bars.

Curtis Bay is also home since 1897 to the United States Coast Guard Yard 
(formerly the U.S. Revenue Cutter Service until 1915)  on Hawkins Point Road / extending south from Pennington Avenue (Maryland Route 173) on Arundel Cove off Curtis Creek on the border line with neighboring suburban Anne Arundel County to the south.
During the middle and late 19th and early 20th centuries, a Quarantine Station  and lazaretto run by the United States Government agency (future U.S. Public Health Service) along Thoms Cove between Sledds Point and Hawkins Point.

There is a large Polish American community in Curtis Bay. The former town hall, real estate office, volunteer fire station, and meeting/assembly hall on the second floor for Curtis Bay was constructed  on the heights overlooking the new town and rapidly developing industrial waterfront along  Fairview Avenue (now Fairhaven Avenue) facing Filbert Street by a successor developing firm, the South Baltimore Harbor and Improvement Company in 1905. In 1925, the United Polish Societies purchased the building and named it Polish Home Hall and it became central to the Polish ethnic experience in Curtis Bay, functioning as a social, educational, and political center for Curtis Bay's Polish community into the 1970s.

References

External links

Community of Curtis Bay Association

 
Neighborhoods in Baltimore
Polish-American culture in Baltimore
Polish communities in the United States
Maryland populated places on the Chesapeake Bay
Poverty in Maryland
Working-class culture in Baltimore